The Sekong Bridge is a bridge on the Sekong River near the town of Stung Treng that was opened in 2008. Construction of the bridge was funded by an interest-free loan from the Chinese Government.

The Sekong Bridge links Stung Treng Province to National Road No.7 (AH11) that goes all the way from Skuon to Luang Prabang in Laos.

Construction
On November 18, 2004, a ceremony was held in Stung Treng Province for the construction of the Sekong Bridge and National Road No.7. The bridge was built on the Sekong River by Shanghai Construction Group General Co.

Inauguration
On April 29, 2008, a ceremony was held that inaugurated the Sekong Bridge, along with National Road No.7.

References

Buildings and structures in Stung Treng province
Road bridges in Cambodia
2008 establishments in Cambodia